Richard Daddy Owubokiri (born 16 July 1961), commonly known as Ricky, is a Nigerian former professional footballer who played as a striker.

Football career
Born in Port Harcourt, Rivers State, Ricky started his career in his native country before playing four seasons in Brazil, where he played for America Football Club (RJ) and Esporte Clube Vitória, a club he would return to in 1994 in the Brazilian Série A. He had a spell in France with Stade Lavallois and FC Metz.

Ricky moved to Portugal to play for S.L. Benfica, in December 1988, but appeared very rarely with the team in the 1988–89 season, scoring only six goals, all in the same Portuguese Cup fixture against Atlético Riachense. He moved to C.F. Estrela da Amadora, where he played in the 1989–90 and 1990–91 seasons, winning the Taça de Portugal in 1990. He then moved north to Boavista FC, for the 1991–92 season. His impact was instant, helping the side finish third in his first season with the addition of the Taça de Portugal, as the player netted 30 times in the Primeira Liga, being the top scorer.

Ricky retired in 1997 at the age of 36, after one-year stints with C.F. Os Belenenses, Al-Arabi Sports Club and Al-Hilal FC.

He had 23 caps for Nigeria, scoring a single goal. Owubokiri was picked for the 1982 African Cup of Nations in Libya, but missed  the 1994 FIFA World Cup.

Career statistics

International goals
Source:

References

External links
 
 

1961 births
Living people
Sportspeople from Port Harcourt
Nigerian footballers
Association football forwards
Nigeria Professional Football League players
Campeonato Brasileiro Série A players
Ligue 1 players
Saudi Professional League players
ACB Lagos F.C. players
America Football Club (RJ) players
Esporte Clube Vitória players
Stade Lavallois players
FC Metz players
Primeira Liga players
S.L. Benfica footballers
C.F. Estrela da Amadora players
Boavista F.C. players
C.F. Os Belenenses players
Qatar Stars League players
Al-Arabi SC (Qatar) players
Al Hilal SFC players
Nigeria international footballers
1982 African Cup of Nations players
Nigerian expatriate footballers
Expatriate footballers in Brazil
Expatriate footballers in France
Expatriate footballers in Portugal
Expatriate footballers in Qatar
Expatriate footballers in Saudi Arabia
Nigerian expatriate sportspeople in Brazil
Nigerian expatriate sportspeople in France
Nigerian expatriate sportspeople in Portugal
Nigerian expatriate sportspeople in Qatar
Nigerian expatriate sportspeople in Saudi Arabia